The Kingdom of Tashir-Dzoraget ( Tashir-Dzorageti t'agavorut'yun), alternatively known as the Kingdom of Lori or Kiurikian Kingdom by later historians, was a medieval Armenian kingdom formed in the year 979 by the Kiurikian dynasty, a branch of the Bagratuni dynasty, as a vassal kingdom of the Bagratid Kingdom of Armenia. The first capital of the kingdom was Matsnaberd, currently part of modern-day Azerbaijan.

It was located on the territories of modern-day northern Armenia, northwestern Azerbaijan and southern Georgia. The founder of the kingdom and the Kiurikian dynasty was king Kiurike I (also known as Gurgen I).

In 979 King Smbat II of Armenia granted the province of Tashir to his brother Kiurike with the title of king. The branch went on to outlive the main one in Ani.

It became especially strong during the reign of King David I Anhoghin who succeeded his father Kiurike and ruled between 989 and 1048. David I Anhoghin conquered some territories from Emirates of Tbilisi and Ganja, and chose Samshvilde as his residence. In 1001, he unsuccessfully tried to gain independence from the Bagratid kings. After failing he was punished by King Gagik I, who confiscated all of his possessions; after this David was to become known as "Anhoghin" meaning "the Landless." David I was succeeded by his son Kiurike II, who ruled between 1048 and 1089. After the fall of the Bagratid Kingdom of Armenia in 1045, Kiurike II was bestowed by the Byzantines with the title of Kouropalates and became an independent ruler.

Kiurike II moved the capital from Matsnaberd to Lori in 1064. During the Seljuk invasions of the Caucasus, Kiurke II nominally became a vassal of the Seljuk Empire.

At the peak of its power, kingdom of Tashir-Dzoraget became suzerain of the Emirate of Tiflis and the kingdom of Kakheti-Hereti, where a branch of Kiurikian dynasty ruled from 1029 to 1105.

In 1089, David II succeeded his father Kiurike II, and ruled until 1118 when Tashir-Dzoraget was annexed to the Kingdom of Georgia.

After this, the Kiurikians, having strengthened themselves in the fortresses of Tavush, Matsnaberd and Nor-Berd, retained their royal title until the beginning of the 13th century, when  Mongols conquered the region.

Unlike their Bagratuni relatives, the Kiurikian kings were unique in minting their own coins, with the line, "May the Lord aid Kiurike (George) the Khorapaghat (Kouropalates)," running in five lines inscribed on the reverse side. They sponsored the construction of a number of churches and monasteries in northern Armenia, including those in Sanahin, Haghpat and Haghartsin, where a great many of them were interred.

Gallery

References

See also
Bagratid Armenia
Gugark

Bagratid Armenia
Armenian kingdoms